The Declaration of Helsinki is a document setting out ethical principles for human medical experimentation. The term may also refer to:
The Helsinki Accords
Declaration of Helsinki (Information Technology), the Global Cities principles
The Helsinki Declaration for Patient Safety in Anaesthesiology